Cumberland State Forest is a Virginia state forest located in the piedmont of the state, in Cumberland and Buckingham counties.  The  forest borders the Willis River. Within its confines may be found Bear Creek Lake State Park and a small family cemetery containing the grave of Charles Irving Thornton; the grave marker, with its inscription by Charles Dickens, is on the National Register of Historic Places.

References
Forest website

Virginia state forests
Protected areas of Cumberland County, Virginia
1939 establishments in Virginia
Protected areas established in 1939